Sosti is a community in the municipal unit of Amaliada, Elis, Greece. It is situated in a rural plain, south of the river Pineios. It is 2 km southwest of Avgeio, 2 km east of Roupaki, 4 km northwest of Chavari, 5 km southeast of Tragano and 8 km north of Amaliada.

Population

See also
List of settlements in Elis

References

Populated places in Elis